Thoroughbred valuation is the art of determining the value or potential value of a Thoroughbred horse, particularly of race horses.

Prices on Thoroughbreds vary greatly, depending on age, pedigree, conformation, and other market factors.  In 2007, Keeneland Sales, a United States-based sales company, sold 9,124 horses at auction, with a total value of $814,401,000, which gives an average price of $89,259. As a whole for the United States in 2007, The Jockey Club auction statistics indicate that the average weanling sold for $44,407, the average yearling sold for $55,300, average sale price for two-year-olds was $61,843, broodmares averaged $70,150, and horses over two and broodmare prospects sold for an average of $53,243. For Europe, the July 2007 Tattersall's Sale sold 593 horses at auction, with a total for the sale of 10,951,300 guineas, for an average of 18,468 guineas. Doncaster Bloodstock Sales, another British sales firm, in 2007 sold 2,248 horses for a total value of 43,033,881 guineas, making an average of 15,110 guineas per horse.

Averages, however, can be deceiving.  For example, at the 2007 Fall Yearling sale at Keeneland, 3,799 young horses sold for a total of $385,018,600, for an average of $101,347 per horse. However, that average sales price reflected a variation that included at least 19 horses that sold for only $1,000 each and 34 that sold for over $1,000,000 apiece.

The value of a Thoroughbred may be influenced by the purse money it wins.  In 2007, Thoroughbred racehorses earned a total of $1,217,854,602 in all placings, an average earnings per starter of $16,924.  In addition, the track record of a race horse may influence its future value as a breeding animal. Stud fees for stallions that enter breeding can range from $2,500 to $300,000 per mare in the United States, and from £2000 pounds to £75,000 pounds or more in Britain.

Between 1974 and 1988, yearlings sired by Northern Dancer led the Keeneland July Selected Yearling Sale by average price 12 times. In the 1983 Keeneland Sales horse auction, one of Northern Dancer's colts, eventually named Snaafi Dancer, became the first yearling to sell for $10 million at auction. In 1984 12 yearlings by Northern Dancer sold for a sale-record average price of $3,446.666. In the 1980s, Northern Dancer's stud fee reached $1 million, an amount four to five times other stallions and a record that still stands in 2009.

The highest price paid at auction for a Thoroughbred was set in 2006 at $16,000,000 for a two-year-old colt named The Green Monkey,  who was a descendant of Northern Dancer.  Record prices at auction often grab headlines, though they do not necessarily reflect the animal's future success; in the case of The Green Monkey, injuries limited him to only three career starts before being retired to stud in 2008, and he never won a race.

Most expensive Thoroughbred yearlings in history sold at auction
For a number of years, in the 1970s and 1980s, horses sired by Northern Dancer (1961–1990) held the top ten price records, with 174 Northern Dancer offspring selling for a total $160 million at the Keeneland Sales over 22 years.  The National Thoroughbred Racing Association calls him "one of the most influential sires in Thoroughbred history."  At the time of his 1990 death, his descendants had won more than 1,000 stakes races. , twenty-seven of the thirty-three horses on this list were from the Northern Dancer sire line.

The most recent common ancestor in the sire line of all thirty-three horses on this list is Phalaris, all via Pharos except two—Meydan City and King's Consul—via Sickle.

References

Horse racing terminology
Auction-related lists
Horse trade